Diaulos may refer to:

Diaulos (architecture)
Diaulos (running race)
Diaulos (instrument), sometimes (wrongly) used for the aulos
Diaulos (mythology)